Maria Stern (born 5 September 1972) is an Austrian singer-songwriter, teacher, writer and politician. Since August 2018 she is the chairwoman of the Peter Pilz List.

References 

1972 births
Living people
21st-century Austrian women politicians
21st-century Austrian politicians
Politicians from Berlin